ULEB All-Star Games were all-star basketball exhibition games, which took part annually from 1992 until 1994 representing players from the Spanish and the Italian Leagues and also the French in its last edition. The All-Star Games only featured foreign players from each league and were considered as part of the now defunct Spanish and Italian Lega Basket All Star Games in its all three editions, but not of the French League which joined them only in the 1994 Games.

Background
The Union of European Leagues of Basketball (ULEB) was founded by the professional basketball organising bodies of Italy, France and Spain on June 25, 1991 in Rome, Italy in a bid to protect their clubs' financial interests within FIBA as their relationship with the latter has gradually started deteriorating. A year after, in November 1992, the Italian, and the Spanish League decided to unify their annual All-Star Games in a joint event that would feature the best foreign players currently competing in the top basketball leagues of Europe at the time. Madrid was chosen as the host city of the event to celebrate the anniversary of ULEB, under its president Gianluigi Porelli.

Concept
The events were design on the NBA All-Star Game pattern including an exhibition game, a slam-dunk and a three-point shoot contest. The duration of the games were 48 minutes, split in four quarters of twelve minutes each. There were no domestic players representing their leagues, but only the best foreign players were chosen. The majority of them were Americans, but there were also some talented Eastern Europeans such as Arvydas Sabonis, Predrag Danilovic, Zoran Savic, Aleksandar Đorđević, Alexander Volkov, Dejan Bodiroga and the only South American Oscar Schmidt.The first two editions were officially named ACB/Lega and Lega/ACB All-Star Games respectively, depending on the country of origins of the venue, though they were organised by the Spanish and Italian federations who were the founders of ULEB. The last edition was officially renamed ULEB All-Star Game as the other ULEB's founding member, the French Federation participated. The last All-Star Game on November 14, 1994 included three games of 24 minutes between the three Federations, with the Italian League being crowned the winner of the competition after beating the French and the Spanish All-Stars.

List of games

1992 ULEB All-Star Game
Palacio de los Deportes, Madrid, November 14, 1992: Liga ACB All-Stars - Lega Basket All-Stars 136-123  
Liga ACB All-Stars FIAT (Miguel Ángel Martín Fernández, Lolo Sainz): Joe Arlauckas, Tim Burroughs, Darryl Middleton, Velimir Perasović, Harold Pressley, Kevin Pritchard, Arvydas Sabonis, Zoran Savic, Reggie Slater, Chandler Thompson, Andre Turner, Rickie Winslow.
Lega Basket All-Stars POLTI (Alberto Bucci, Ettore Messina): Greg Cadillac Anderson, Predrag Danilovic, Darryl Dawkins, Darren Daye, Aleksandar Đorđević, A.J. English, Pace Mannion, Oscar Schmidt, Dino Radja, Terry Teagle, Alexander Volkov, Haywoode Workman.

1993 ULEB All-Star Game
PalaEur, Rome, November 13, 1993: Lega Basket All-Stars - Liga ACB All-Stars 135-131  
Liga ACB All-Stars (Clifford Luyk, José Alberto Pesquera): Michael Anderson, Joe Arlauckas, Roy Fisher, Dan Godfread, Dennis Hopson, Tony Massenburg, Darryl Middleton, Ivo Nakic, Oscar Schmidt, Fred Roberts, Andy Toolson, Andre Turner.
Lega Basket All-Stars POLTI (Alberto Bucci, Fabrizio Frates): Joe Binion, Dejan Bodiroga, Predrag Danilovic, Aleksandar Đorđević, Winston Garland, Dean Garrett, Dan Gay, Shelton Jones, Cliff Levingston, George McCloud, Micheal Ray Richardson, Henry Williams.

1994 ULEB All-Star Game
Pavelló Municipal Font de Sant Lluís, Valencia, November 14, 1994: Lega Basket All-Stars - LNB All-Stars 58-54  
Pavelló Municipal Font de Sant Lluís, Valencia, November 14, 1994: Liga ACB All-Stars - LNB All-Stars 59-43  
Pavelló Municipal Font de Sant Lluís, Valencia, November 14, 1994: Lega Basket All-Stars - Liga ACB All-Stars 53-48  
Lega Basket All-Stars (Alberto Bucci, Bogdan Tanjevic): Wendell Alexis, Joe Binion, Dejan Bodiroga, Dallas Comegys, Emanual Davis, Aleksandar Đorđević, Dan Gay, Gerald Glass, Billy McCaffrey, Petar Naumoski, Jeff Sanders, John Turner.
Liga ACB All-Stars (Aíto García Reneses, Manu Moreno): Darrell Armstrong, Michael Curry, Roy Fisher, Dan Godfread, Kenny Green, Warren Kidd, Darryl Middleton, Oscar Schmidt, Corny Thompson, Andy Toolson, Andre Turner.
LNB All-Stars (Božidar Maljković, Jacques Monclar): Ron Anderson, Winston Crite, Ron Curry, Tim Kempton, Conrad McRae, David Rivers, Michael Ray Richardson, Delaney Rudd, Rickie Winslow, Michael Young.

Three-Point Shootout

Slam Dunk Contest

Players with multiple selections

Coaches with most appearances

All-time Scorers

References

External links
Liga ACB Historia del All Star 

Basketball all-star games
Basketball governing bodies in Europe
Contests
Lega Basket Serie A
LNB Pro A